Out of pocket may refer to:

 Out-of-pocket expenses
 "Out of Pocket", a song on Mayer Hawthorne's 2016 album Man About Town